Kirstin Holum, CFR (born June 29, 1980) is a retired American speed skater and member of the Franciscan Sisters of the Renewal.

Holum was born to the Olympic skier Mike Devecka and Olympic speed skater Dianne Holum, who coached her through entire career. In 1997, Kirstin won the World Junior All-Around Championships and set three national records on the 3000 m distance. Next year, she competed in the 3000 m and 5000 m events at the 1998 Winter Olympics and finished in sixth and seventh place, respectively.

Afterwards, she retired from skating and graduated in arts from a college in Chicago with a thesis on art and the Olympics. She then joined the Franciscan Sisters of the Renewal, a religious order helping poor and homeless people. Later she moved to Leeds, England, where she became known as Sister Catherine at St. Joseph’s Convent.

References

1980 births
American female speed skaters
Speed skaters at the 1998 Winter Olympics
Olympic speed skaters of the United States
Sportspeople from the Milwaukee metropolitan area
Sportspeople from Waukesha, Wisconsin
Living people
Catholics from Wisconsin
American expatriates in England
21st-century American Roman Catholic nuns